Idrettsgallaen ("the Sports Gala") is a show to honor the past year's Norwegian sports and athletes' achievements. It is hosted annually at Hamar Olympic Amphitheatre in Hamar in early January. The event started in 2001. Hamar was selected because it is the location of the head office of Norsk Tipping, the main sponsor, and organizer of the event together with the Norwegian Broadcasting Corporation and the Norwegian Confederation of Sports. The 2010 edition was, however, hosted at Håkons Hall in Lillehammer.

References

Sport in Norway
Sport in Hamar
Television in Norway